"SportsKid of the Year" was introduced by Sports Illustrated magazine after the highly successful Sportsman of the Year award was introduced in 1954.  The "SportsKid of the Year" award honors a young athlete, ages seven to 15, for superior performance on the field, in the classroom and service in the community.

In addition to being featured exclusively on the December Sports Illustrated Kids cover, the "SportsKid of the Year" receives a profiling article and fold-out poster in the issue. The SportsKid is also honored at Sports Illustrated's annual Sportsman of the Year awards celebration in New York City and in 2011 was featured on Cartoon Network's "Hall of Game" in Los Angeles.

The award has been given to the following recipients:

References

Kid of the Year
American sports trophies and awards
Student athlete awards in the United States
High school sports in the United States
Awards honoring children or youth